Lisa is a surname. Notable people with the surname include:

Esteban Lisa, Argentine painter
 Luba Lisa, Broadway stage actress
 Manuel Lisa (1772–1820), Spanish fur trader, explorer and United States Indian agent

See also
 Lisa (given name)
 Lisa (disambiguation)